Bulgaria competed at the 1956 Summer Olympics in Melbourne, Australia and Stockholm, Sweden (equestrian events).

Medalists

Gold
 Nikola Stanchev — Wrestling, Men's Freestyle Middleweight

Silver
 Dimitar Dobrev — Wrestling, Men's Greco-Roman Middleweight
 Petko Sirakov — Wrestling, Men's Greco-Roman Light Heavyweight
 Yusein Mekhmedov — Wrestling, Men's Freestyle Heavyweight

Bronze
 Stefan Bozhkov, Todor Diev, Georgi Dimitrov, Milcho Goranov, Ivan Petkov Kolev, Nikola Kovachev, Manol Manolov, Dimitar Milanov, Georgi Naydenov, Panayot Panayotov, Kiril Rakarov, Gavril Stoyanov, Krum Yanev, and Yosif Yosifov — Football (soccer), Men's Team Competition

Basketball

Preliminary round

Group C

Quarterfinal

Group B

Classification playoffs

5th place match

Boxing

Football

First round

Quarterfinals

Semifinals

Bronze Medal match

Gymnastics

Weightlifting

Men

Wrestling

References
Official Olympic Reports
International Olympic Committee results database

Nations at the 1956 Summer Olympics
1956